Serigne Khadim N'Diaye (born 5 April 1985) is a Senegalese professional footballer who plays for Guinean side Horoya AC as a goalkeeper.

Club career
Born in Senegal's capital Dakar, N'Diaye began his career 1997 with Espoir Saint Louis and signed 2007 for Casa Sport. In two years with the club he earned 39 caps before joining Senegal Premier League rivals ASC Linguère  in June 2010.

He later signed for Horoya AC. In April 2019 he broke both legs in a match, subsequently receiving a three-year contract extension with the club.

International career
N'Diaye earned his first call-up for the Senegal national team in November 2009 and made his debut on 28 May 2010 against Denmark.

In May 2018 he was named in Senegal's 23-man squad for the 2018 FIFA World Cup in Russia.

Career statistics

References

External links

Living people
1985 births
Footballers from Dakar
Association football goalkeepers
Senegalese footballers
Senegal Premier League players
Allsvenskan players
Casa Sports players
ASC Linguère players
Kalmar FF players
ASC Jaraaf players
Horoya AC players
Génération Foot players
Senegalese expatriate footballers
Senegal international footballers
2012 Africa Cup of Nations players
2017 Africa Cup of Nations players
2018 FIFA World Cup players
Expatriate footballers in Sweden
Expatriate footballers in Guinea
Senegalese expatriate sportspeople in Sweden
Guinée Championnat National players
Senegal A' international footballers
2011 African Nations Championship players
Senegalese expatriate sportspeople in Guinea